Mohammed Sabila (born 1942 – died 19 July 2021) was a Moroccan writer and philosopher.

He was the author of several articles and books on politics and culture, and was known for translating some of the works of Martin Heidegger into Arabic.

Sabila was professor of philosophy at the Mohammed V University of Rabat, chief editor of the magazine Madarat and president of the Societé de Philosophie du Maroc.

Sabila died of COVID-19 in Rabat on 19 July 2021, aged 79.

Bibliography
Human Rights 1990
Ideology 1993
Culture and Politics 1995
Human Rights and Democracy 1999
Modernity and Postmodernity 2000
Through Politics, For Politics 2000
Morocco and Modernity 2000
Boudani Brahim, 2003, An Annotated Translation of selected chapters from Mohammed Sabila’s بين الأصولية الحداثة

References

External links
Qantara.de Interview with Mohammed Sabila.  ( first published by the Zeitschrift für Kulturaustausch of Germany's Institute for Foreign Relations in 2005)

1942 births
2021 deaths
Moroccan writers
Moroccan philosophers
Academic staff of Mohammed V University
People from Casablanca
Deaths from the COVID-19 pandemic in Morocco